Roberto Antonio Nanni (born 20 August 1981) is an Argentine retired football forward.

Club career
Nanni started playing professionally for Vélez Sársfield in 2001. While at the team, he reached the final fixture of the 2003 Clausura as the league's top scorer with 15 goals, 3 more than Rosario Central's Luciano Figueroa. However, Figueroa scored 5 goals in his team's 7–2 victory over Boca Juniors, that played the game with a youth squad, frustrating Nanni's possibility of becoming the league's top scorer. During that tournament, in which Vélez finished third under Carlos Ischia's coaching, Nanni scored the only goal of the 1–0 victory over River Plate, ending a 12-year period without victories for the team in the Estadio Monumental Antonio Vespucio Liberti.

On 29 August 2003, the Argentine forward was signed by FC Dynamo Kyiv, for a club's record fee –at that time– of around €5 million. While in Dynamo Kyiv, he hardly play for the senior squad, participating only in reserve competitions. In October 2004 he was loaned to UD Almería in Spain, starting a loan span that took him to Siena in July 2005, Messina in January 2006 and lastly Crotone in August 2006 (all in Italy). In January 2008 he was released by Dynamo and rejoined Vélez.

Upon his return, the striker won with his team the 2009 Clausura, scoring one goal in the second game, against Argentinos Juniors. Nanni played 11 games during the tournament, mostly coming on as a substitute.

In July 2009, at the request of coach Pedro Troglio, he joined Paraguayan champions Cerro Porteño, on a free transfer. The striker helped his team reach the semifinals of both the 2009 Copa Sudamericana and the 2011 Copa Libertadores (being the joint top scorer in the latter, with 7 goals). Nanni also won with Cerro Porteño the 2012 Apertura and was the joint top scorer of the 2010 Clausura. After five years playing for Cerro Porteño, the Argentine forward had a fight with the club's President Juan José Zapag and his contract was terminated. With 59 goals in all competitions, Nanni is the 5th top goal scorer in the history of Cerro Porteño.

After Cerro Porteño, the forward joined Atlante F.C., where he played for six months in 2013. In February 2014, Nanni joined Vélez Sarsfield on a free transfer for his third spell with the club, signing for one year.

Honours

Club
Vélez Sársfield
Argentine Primera División (1): 2009 Clausura
Cerro Porteño
Paraguayan Primera División (1): 2012 Apertura

Individual
Paraguayan Primera División top scorer (1): 2010 Clausura (with Cerro Porteño)
Copa Libertadores top scorer (1): 2011 (with Cerro Porteño)

References

 Los argentinos Gracián y Nanni en los planes del Cúcuta Deportivo‚ laopinion.com.co, 20 January 2016

External links
 Profile at Vélez Sarsfield's official website 
 Argentine Primera statistics at Fútbol XXI  
 ESPN Statistics 
 
 

1981 births
Living people
Sportspeople from Buenos Aires Province
Argentine people of Italian descent
Argentine footballers
Argentine Primera División players
Serie A players
Serie B players
Ukrainian Premier League players
Ukrainian First League players
Segunda División players
Paraguayan Primera División players
Liga MX players
Categoría Primera B players
Club Atlético Vélez Sarsfield footballers
FC Dynamo Kyiv players
FC Dynamo-2 Kyiv players
A.C.N. Siena 1904 players
A.C.R. Messina players
UD Almería players
F.C. Crotone players
Cerro Porteño players
Atlante F.C. footballers
Cúcuta Deportivo footballers
Argentine expatriate footballers
Expatriate footballers in Paraguay
Expatriate footballers in Italy
Expatriate footballers in Spain
Expatriate footballers in Ukraine
Expatriate footballers in Mexico
Expatriate footballers in Colombia
Argentine expatriate sportspeople in Paraguay
Argentine expatriate sportspeople in Italy
Argentine expatriate sportspeople in Spain
Argentine expatriate sportspeople in Ukraine
Association football forwards
Club Nacional footballers